Fortunella is a 1958 Italian comedy film directed by Eduardo De Filippo, with script by Federico Fellini.

Cast

 Giulietta Masina: Nanda Diotallevi, aka 'Fortunella' 
 Alberto Sordi: Peppino 
 Paul Douglas: Professor Golfiero Paganica 
 Eduardo De Filippo:  Head of the Theater Company 
 Piera Arico: Katya 
 Nando Bruno: The American 
 Guido Celano: The Doorman
 Carlo Dapporto: The Actor
 Carlo Delle Piane: Riccardino 
 Enrico Glori: The Gambler 
 Franca Marzi: Amelia 
 Mimmo Poli: Orso Bruno 
 Aldo Silvani: Guidobaldi

Music
The film's score, composed by Nino Rota, notably contains three memorable motifs, two of which would be reused in Rota's most famous film compositions: La Dolce Vita (1960) and The Godfather (1972). Another prominent motif had already been used in another Rota composition, Il Bidone (1955).

45th Academy Awards

At the 45th Academy Awards, Nino Rota's score for The Godfather was removed at the last minute from the list of nominees for Best Original Score when it was discovered that the melody in "Speak Softly Love (Love Theme from The Godfather)" had previously been used in Fortunella.

External links

References

1958 films
Italian black-and-white films
Films scored by Nino Rota
1950s Italian-language films
Films set in Italy
Films directed by Eduardo De Filippo
Films with screenplays by Federico Fellini
1950s Italian films